is a Japanese judoka. He won two gold medals and a silver medal at the World Judo Championships.

He is from Matsuyama, Ehime. After graduation from Meiji University, He belonged to Tokyo Metropolitan Police Department. He is currently a Japan heavyweight division player.

Muneta was born in Matsuyama, Ehime prefecture, in 1981. Having been taught  foundations of jacket wrestling by his father as a child, after graduating from primary school, he entered the prestigious Kodo-school, which is well known for its judo. After graduating from Tsurumaki junior high school he continued on to Setagaya Gakuen senior high school. In 1998, while in third grade at Setagaya Gakuen, he led his school's judo team to victory in the final match against Kokushikan senior high school's team by accomplishing, for the first time in history, a four man in a row victory during the Kinshuki High School Judo Tournament. Individually, having won both the All-Japan High School Judo Championships as well as the Inter-High Tournament, he is also the youngest ever winner of the Kano Jigoro Cup. He was mentioned as the strongest senior high school judo athlete both in name and reality.

After graduating from Setagaya Gakuen senior high school, Muneta entered Meiji University. During his university period he won the Kodokan Cup (1999 and 2001), participated in the World Judo Championships as well as many other world top level tournaments. Furthermore, he has been elected as the “most excellent player” 4 years in a row at the All-Japan University Judo Championships (including Yasuhiro Yamashita, Masaki Yoshimi and Muneta Yasuyuki, there are only 5 athletes in the history of judo that have been elected “most excellent athlete” 4 years in a row).

After graduating from university he found employment at the Japanese National Police Agency. By defeating powerful judo athletes like Tamerlan Tmenov (Russia) at the 2003 World Judo Championships in Osaka, he became world champion in the +100 kg division at the age of 22. At the 2007 World Judo Championships in Rio de Janeiro he was victorious in the open division. Today, he is still active as a representative judo athlete for Japan in the +100 kg division. At present, Mr. Muneta is employed at the Japanese National Police Agency. He holds the 5th Dan in Kodokan judo.

References

External links
 

Japanese male judoka
1981 births
People from Matsuyama, Ehime
Living people
Place of birth missing (living people)
Asian Games medalists in judo
World judo champions
Judoka at the 2002 Asian Games
Judoka at the 2006 Asian Games
Jacket Wrestlers
Asian Games gold medalists for Japan
Medalists at the 2002 Asian Games
Medalists at the 2006 Asian Games
Universiade medalists in judo
Universiade gold medalists for Japan
Medalists at the 1999 Summer Universiade